Caprelloidea is a superfamily of marine crustaceans in the order Amphipoda. It includes "untypical" forms of amphipods, such as the skeleton shrimps (Caprellidae) and whale lice (Cyamidae). The group was formerly treated as one of the four amphipod suborders, Caprellidea, but has been moved down to the superfamily rank by Myers & Lowry (2003, 2013) after phylogenetic studies of the group, and is now contained in the infraorder Corophiida of the suborder Senticaudata. The group includes the following families.

 Caprellidae Leach, 1814: Skeleton shrimps
 Caprogammaridae Kudrjaschov & Vassilenko, 1966
 Cyamidae Rafinesque, 1815: Whale lice
 Dulichiidae Laubitz, 1983
 Podoceridae Leach, 1814

See also
 
 
 Caprellidira

References

External links
 
 

Corophiidea
Arthropod superfamilies